Kathleen Mannington Caffyn, née Hunt (c. 1855 – 6 February 1926) was an Irish-Australian novelist.

Life
Kathleen was born in Tipperary, Ireland, daughter of William de Vere Hunt, and related to Aubrey de Vere, the poet. She was educated by English and German governesses and moved to London at about 21 years of age. She trained as a nurse and married in 1879 Stephen Mannington Caffyn, a medical practitioner (1851–1896), who was born at Salehurst, Sussex. She moved with him to Sydney in 1880.

In 1883 they went to Melbourne, where Dr Caffyn had suburban practices, and lived in Brighton until 1892, when they returned to London. Mrs Mannington Caffyn was a founder of the District Nursing Society in Victoria and served on its committee for around two years. Caffyn had a love of horses and kept up her interest in hunting and polo until her death in Turin, Italy on 6 February 1926. She was survived by a son.

Writings
Mrs Caffyn contributed a story of some 60 pages to Cooee: Tales of Australian Life by Australian Ladies (1891), and wrote a novel A Yellow Aster, which was published in London in 1894 under the pseudonym "Iota", but had been written in Australia, as the saga of a free-thinking, agnostic family. It had immediate success and was quickly followed by Children of Circumstance (1892) and some 15 other volumes in the 20 years that followed. These included A Quaker Grandmother (1896), Anne Mauleverer (1899), He for God Only (1903), and Patricia: a Mother (1903), which rank among her better novels and were popular in their time. All her novels except her first were written after her return to England. Her last novel was Merry Mirrilies (1916).

In Australia her husband contributed to The Bulletin in its early days, and published Miss Milne and I (1889), a novel which ran into two or three editions. This was followed by Poppy's Tears (1890). He also wrote a few medical pamphlets.

Reminiscence
Caffyn Place in the Canberra suburb of Garran is named in her honour.

References

Sources
Adelaide, Debra (1988) Australian women writers: a bibliographic guide, London, Pandora
Geulah Solomon, 'Caffyn, Stephen Mannington (1850–1896)', Australian Dictionary of Biography, Volume 3, MUP, 1969, pp. 325–327

1855 births
1926 deaths
19th-century Australian novelists
20th-century Australian novelists
Australian women novelists
Irish emigrants to colonial Australia
20th-century Australian women writers
19th-century Australian women writers